Monit is a free, open-source process supervision tool for Unix and Linux. With Monit, system status can be viewed directly from the command line, or via the native HTTP(S) web server. Monit is able to do automatic maintenance, repair, and run meaningful causal actions in error situations. Monit rose to popularity with Ruby on Rails and the Mongrel web server, because a tool was needed that could manage the many identical Mongrel processes that needed to be run to support a scalable Ruby on Rails site, and Monit was fairly uniquely suited for the needs of the Ruby on Rails community. Many popular Rails sites have used Monit, including Twitter and scribd.

Monit can restart a process automatically if process dies or monitor process characteristics, such as  memory or cpu cycles and alert by email or execute and action.

Additionally M/Monit can monitor and manage distributed computer systems, M/Monit uses Monit as an agent and can manage and monitor. M/Monit is licensed software.

References

External links
 
 Monit project page at Bitbucket
 Gentoo wiki: Monit

Software using the GNU AGPL license
Unix process- and task-management-related software